Ali Nouisri (born 20 January 1994) is a Tunisian cyclist, who rides for Emirati amateur team Yasi Team. He rode in the road race at the 2016 Summer Olympics.

Major results

2014
 2nd Time trial, National Road Championships
2015
 3rd Road race, National Road Championships
 5th Overall Tour International de Sétif
 7th Time trial, African Under-23 Road Championships
 10th Critérium International de Sétif
2016
 National Road Championships
1st  Road race
2nd Time trial
 5th Overall Tour International de Sétif
1st Young rider classification
 5th Overall Tour d'Oranie
1st Young rider classification
 6th Overall Tour du Sénégal
2017
 National Road Championships
1st  Road race
1st  Time trial
 3rd Overall Tour de Tunisie
1st Young rider classification
1st Stage 3
 4th Overall Tour du Sénégal
2018
 National Road Championships
1st  Road race
1st  Time trial
 1st Stage 6 Tour d'Algérie
 4th Overall Tour de la Pharmacie Centrale
 5th Grand Prix de la Pharmacie Centrale
2019
 1st  Time trial, National Road Championships

References

External links
 
 

1994 births
Living people
Tunisian male cyclists
Cyclists at the 2016 Summer Olympics
Olympic cyclists of Tunisia
21st-century Tunisian people